The Eifelsteig is a long-distance hiking trail in the Eifel, Germany.

References
Citations

Bibliography

External links

Hiking trails in Rhineland-Palatinate
Hiking trails in North Rhine-Westphalia
Eifel